Donovin Lee Darius (born August 12, 1975) is a former American football safety in the National Football League. He was drafted by the Jacksonville Jaguars 25th overall in the 1998 NFL Draft, and played for nine seasons with the team. He played for the Miami Dolphins in 2007. He played college football at Syracuse.

College career
Darius played for two years at Highland Regional High School in Blackwood, New Jersey before transferring in his junior year. Darius is a graduate of Woodrow Wilson High School in Camden, New Jersey.

Darius played at Syracuse University, setting the team record for tackles by a defensive back with 379.  He was a Big East All-Conference player in 1995 and 1996, and also lettered in indoor and outdoor hurdles, graduating in 1997 with a degree in exercise science and a minor in coaching.

Professional career
Darius was selected 25th overall in the 1998 NFL Draft by the Jacksonville Jaguars, then the highest pick ever by the team for a defensive back. He was the sixth defensive back selected, behind Tebucky Jones, Duane Starks, and others. He was named to the All-Rookie team and led Jaguar defensive backs with 108 tackles in 14 games. In 1999, he switched to strong safety and continued to sharpen his skills as a defensive force.

In 2004, Darius led the secondary in tackles for a seventh straight season and posted career highs in forced fumbles and interceptions. His season-ending injury in 2005 stopped his consecutive start streak at 37.

In 2004, Darius was ejected and fined $75,000 for an illegal clothesline tackle on Green Bay Packers wide receiver Robert Ferguson.  However, Darius later apologized to Ferguson for the incident by calling him at the hospital. Prior to his release, he had been with the Jaguars longer than any other active player along with running back Fred Taylor.

Darius signed a three-year extension on August 29, 2005 which put him under contract through 2008.  However, he tore his anterior cruciate ligament during the Jaguars' second game of the 2005 NFL season and was placed on injured reserve.

On November 20, 2006, during a Monday Night Football game against the New York Giants, he broke his leg and missed the rest of the 2006 season.

On December 14, 2006, Darius was released by the Jaguars.

Donovin signed with the Oakland Raiders on January 1, 2007, but was released in the final roster cuts. He was subsequently signed by the Miami Dolphins, but was released again in October.

Darius signed a one-day ceremonial contract with the Jaguars on March 1, 2013 to retire as a member of the team.  He currently serves on the NFL Players Association Executive Committee and resides in Jacksonville, Florida, where he earned an MBA from Jacksonville University.

Personal life
According to the Jacksonville Sheriff's Office, Darius was arrested and charged with DUI after crashing his car on the morning of January 26, 2020. He was subsequently transported to a Jacksonville area hospital for a mental health evaluation after telling rescue workers he had ingested 20 to 30 pills and that he was suicidal.

References

American football safeties
Jacksonville Jaguars players
Oakland Raiders players
Miami Dolphins players
Syracuse Orange football players
1975 births
Living people
Players of American football from Camden, New Jersey
Woodrow Wilson High School (New Jersey) alumni